God Is Able may refer to:

 God Is Able (Ron Kenoly album), 1994
 God Is Able (Hillsong album), 2011